CSKA  (Bulgarian: ЦСКА) was a Bulgarian sports society from Sofia, Bulgaria. CSKA stands for Central Sports Club of the Army. It was founded on 5 May 1948 as Septemvri pri CDV, after the unification of the two sports clubs from the city, Chavdar and Septemvri. Since then, the club changed its name several times before settling on CSKA in 1989.

The club is historically known as the Bulgarian Army sports club. Currently the sports club's departments are autonomous and are separated as of 1992. Therefore, the only connection of the departments to the Army are the historical traditions and the Bulgarian Army Stadium. Nevertheless, in the moment all of the clubs who have a connection to the sports society are incorporated into one joint society called United Sports Clubs CSKA, which is currently а successor of the previous disbanded organization.

Currently sections which belong to CSKA Sofia are football, basketball, volleyball, tennis, wrestling, athletics, ice hockey, chess, gymnastics, handball, taekwondo, boxing, cycling, weightlifting, judo, and rowing.

Departments
The most popular departments of the sports club are:
 PFC CSKA Sofia, football club
 BC CSKA Sofia, basketball club
 HC CSKA Sofia, ice hockey club
 VC CSKA Sofia, volleyball club
 WK CSKA Sofia, water polo club
 HBC CSKA Sofia, handball club

Football

Men
First League:
 Champions (31) (record): 1948, 1951, 1952, 1954, 1955, 1956, 1957, 1958, 1958–59, 1959–60, 1960–61, 1961–62, 1965–66, 1968–69, 1970–71, 1971–72, 1972–73, 1974–75, 1975–76, 1979–80, 1980–81, 1981–82, 1982–83, 1986–87, 1988–89, 1989–90, 1991–92, 1996–97, 2002–03, 2004–05, 2007–08
Bulgarian V Group:
 Champions (1): 2015–16
Bulgarian Cup:
 Winners (21 times): 1951, 1954, 1955, 1960–61, 1964–65, 1968–69, 1971–72, 1972–73, 1973–74, 1982–83, 1984–85, 1986–87, 1987–88, 1988–89, 1992–93, 1996–97, 1998–99, 2005–06, 2010–11, 2015–16, 2020–21
Bulgarian Supercup:
 Winners (4): 1989, 2006, 2008, 2011
Bulgarian Cup – (unofficial tournament)
Winners (1 time): 1980-81
Cup of the Soviet Army
Winners (4 times): 1984-85, 1985-1986, 1988-89, 1989-90
European Cup / UEFA Champions League
 Semi-finals (2): 1966–67, 1981–82
 Quarter-finals (4): 1956–57, 1973–74, 1980–81, 1989–90
UEFA Cup / UEFA Europa League
 2nd round (round of 32) – 1984–85, 1991–92, 1998–99, 2001–02
 Group stage (4): 2005–06, 2009–10, 2010–11, 2020–21
European Cup Winners' Cup / UEFA Cup Winners' Cup
 Semi-finals (1): 1988–89
UEFA Europa Conference League
 Group stage (1): 2021–22

PFC CSKA Sofia II
 Bulgarian V Group:
 Champions (1): 1982–83

Women
Bulgarian League:
 Champions (2): 1988–89, 1992–93
Bulgarian Cup:
 Winners (2 times): 1986–87, 1989–90

Volleyball

Men
NVL:
 Champions (29) (record): 1948, 1949, 1957, 1958, 1962, 1968, 1969, 1970, 1971, 1972, 1973, 1976, 1977, 1978, 1981, 1982, 1983, 1984, 1986, 1987, 1988, 1989, 1990, 1993, 1994, 1995, 2008, 2010, 2011
Bulgarian Cup:
 Winners (19 times) (record): 1967, 1969, 1970, 1973, 1979, 1981, 1982, 1984, 1985, 1986, 1988, 1990, 1991, 1992, 1993, 2002, 2009, 2010, 2011
 CEV Champions League:
Winners (1): 1968-69
CEV Champions League "Final Four" Participant:
 1962-63 (1/2 final), 1970-71 (1/2 final)
 1976-77 (3-rd), 1984-85 (3-rd)
 1986-87 (4-th), 1987-88 (4-th), 1989-90 (4-th)
Cup Winner's Cup:
 Winners (1): 1975-76
Cup Winner's Cup "Final Four" Participant:
 1985-86 (3-rd)
 1980-81 (4-th)
CEV Cup "Final Four" Participant:
 2010-11 (1/2 final)

WomenNVL: 
 Champions (22): 1978, 1979, 1982, 1983, 1985, 1986, 1987, 1988, 1989, 1991, 1992, 1993, 1995, 2000, 2004, 2005, 2007, 2008, 2010, 2011, 2012, 2013Bulgarian Cup: 
 Winners (19 times): 1969, 1976, 1979, 1981, 1982, 1983, 1985, 1986, 1988, 1989, 1993, 1995, 1996, 2000, 2004, 2008, 2010, 2011, 2013CEV Champions League: Winners (2): 1978-79, 1983-84
CEV Champions League "Final Four" Participant:
 1987-88 (4-th), 1988-89 (4-th)Cup Winner's Cup 
 Winners (1): 1981-82
Cup Winner's Cup "Final Four" Participant:
1972-73 (2-nd), 1975-76 (2-nd), 1990-91 (2-nd),
1980-81 (3-rd),
 1976-77 (4-th),Challenge Cup 
 Eighth-finals (1): 1994-95

Basketball

MenNBL: 
 Champions (12): 1949, 1950, 1951, 1965, 1967, 1977, 1980, 1983, 1984, 1990, 1991, 1992Bulgarian Cup: Winners (17 times) (record): 1953, 1955, 1962, 1963, 1973, 1974, 1977, 1978, 1981, 1984, 1985, 1989, 1990, 1991, 1992, 1994, 2005BBL A Group/Second League: Champions (1): 2021–22European Champions' Cup 
 Quarter-finals (2): 1965–66, 1967–68FIBA European Cup Winners' Cup 
 Semi-finals (1): 1974–75
 Quarter-finals (2): 1973–74, 1975–76

WomenBulgarian Championship: 
 Champions (1): 2006–07Bulgarian Cup: Winners (1 time): 2007Women's Adriatic League: Winners (1 time): 2006–07EuroCup Women 1/16 finalists (1): 2006–07

Hockey

MenBulgarian League: Champions (16): 1964, 1965, 1966, 1967, 1969, 1971, 1972, 1973, 1974, 1975, 1983, 1984, 1986, 2013, 2014, 2015Bulgarian Cup: Winners (14 times): 1964, 1965, 1967, 1972, 1973, 1975, 1976, 1978, 1981, 1983, 1986, 1987, 2012, 2013

Handball

MenA Group: Champions (10): 1976, 1978, 1979, 1981, 1983, 1984, 1987, 1989, 1990, 1991Bulgarian Cup: Winners (10 times): 1981, 1982, 1984, 1985, 1987, 1988, 1990, 1991, 1992, 2002European Champions' Cup 1/8 finalists (5): 1979–80, 1981–82, 1983–84, 1984–85, 1989–90Cup Winners' Cup Quarter-finals (1): 1980–81IHF Cup Quarter-finals (1): 1986–87

WomenA Group: Champions (12): 1973, 1974, 1975, 1976, 1978, 1983, 1985, 1987, 1989, 1990, 1991, 1992Bulgarian Cup: Winners (8 times): 1975, 1976, 1982, 1984, 1985, 1988, 1989, 1992European Champions' Cup Quarter-finals (3): 1973–74, 1974–75, 1983–84Cup Winners' Cup Semi-finals (2): 1984–85, 1988–89
 Quarter-finals (1): 1977–78

Water polo

MenBulgarian Championship: 
 Champions (39) (record): 1952, 1961, 1962, 1963, 1964, 1965, 1966, 1969, 1973, 1974, 1975, 1976, 1977, 1979, 1980, 1981, 1982, 1983, 1984, 1985, 1986, 1988, 1989, 1992, 1994, 1995, 1998, 1999, 2000, 2001, 2003, 2005, 2006, 2007, 2011, 2012, 2014, 2015, 2021Bulgarian Cup: Winners (31 times) (record) 2007, 2011, 2015, 2017European Cup 1/4 finalists (4):''' 1969–70, 1973–74, 1976–77, 1989–90

Medals(*)Statistics can be inaccurate. Medals are not included if they were won by a player who competed for CSKA but was at another club when he/she won a medal.''

Trophies

 
Sports clubs established in 1948
Multi-sport clubs in Bulgaria
Military sports clubs
1948 establishments in Bulgaria